Heather Jo Clark (born September 19, 1980) is an American mixed martial artist who competed in the Strawweight division of the Ultimate Fighting Championship (UFC), and currently competes for Invicta Fighting Championships (Invicta).

Mixed martial arts career

Early career
Clark made her professional MMA debut in April 2010.  During the first two and a half years of her career, she amassed a record of 5 wins and 3 losses.

Bellator MMA
Clark signed with Bellator MMA in 2013 and faced Felice Herrig at Bellator 94. She lost the back-and-forth fight via split decision.  Clark and Herrig would later have a rematch on their season of The Ultimate Fighter.

The Ultimate Fighter
Heather was the among the final 8 contestants that tried out for the TUF house, to join the 11 Invicta FC strawweights that President Dana White had acquired.

Heather was Team Melendez' sixth pick and ranked 11. She was paired to take on long-time rival #6 ranked Felice Herrig for her first fight.

In episode 5 Clark and Herrig fought with Herrig walking away with the unanimous decision. After the fight, Clark said she did some "soul-searching" and apologized to Herrig, saying she wasn't going to judge her anymore, squashing their feud.

Ultimate Fighting Championship
Clark made her UFC debut at The Ultimate Fighter 20 Finale where she defeated teammate and rival Bec Rawlings by unanimous decision. Heather faced Karolina Kowalkiewicz on May 8, 2016 at UFC Fight Night 87 in Rotterdam, Netherlands. She lost the fight by unanimous decision.

Her next fight came on November 5, 2016 at The Ultimate Fighter Latin America 3 Finale: dos Anjos vs. Ferguson against Alexa Grasso She lost the fight by unanimous decision.

Invicta Fighting Championships 
After almost two years hiatus, Clark joined Invicta Fighting Championships  (Invicta) and made her promotional debut on July 21, 2018 at Invicta FC 30: Frey vs. Grusander against Kinbery Novaes. She won the fight via unanimous decision.

Clark was scheduled to face Mizuki Inoue on November 16, 2018 at Invicta FC 32: Spencer vs. Sorenson but pulled out before the event.

Championships and achievements

Mixed martial arts
Women's MMA Press Awards
2011 KO of the year

Mixed martial arts record

|-
|Win
|align=center|8–6
|Kinberly Novaes
|Decision (unanimous)
|Invicta FC 30: Frey vs. Grusander
|
|align=center|3
|align=center|5:00
|Kansas City, Missouri, United States
|
|-
|Loss
|align=center|7–6
|Alexa Grasso
|Decision (unanimous)
|The Ultimate Fighter Latin America 3 Finale: dos Anjos vs. Ferguson
|
|align=center|3
|align=center|5:00
|Mexico City, Mexico
|
|-
|Loss
|align=center|7–5
|Karolina Kowalkiewicz
|Decision (unanimous)
|UFC Fight Night: Overeem vs. Arlovski
|
|align=center|3
|align=center|5:00
|Rotterdam, Netherlands
|
|-
| Win
|align=center| 7–4
| Bec Rawlings
| Decision (unanimous)
|The Ultimate Fighter: A Champion Will Be Crowned Finale
|
|align=center|3
|align=center|5:00
|Las Vegas, Nevada, United States
|
|-
| Win
|align=center| 6–4
| Hannah Cifers
| Decision (unanimous)
|XFC 26 - Night of Champions 3
|
|align=center|3
|align=center|5:00
| Nashville, Tennessee, United States
|
|-
| Loss
|align=center| 5–4
| Felice Herrig
| Decision (split)
|Bellator 94
|
|align=center|3
|align=center|5:00
| Tampa, Florida, United States
|
|-
| Loss
|align=center| 5–3
| Stephanie Eggink
| Decision (unanimous)
|XFC 21 - Night of Champions 2
|
|align=center|3
|align=center|5:00
|Nashville, Tennessee, United States
|
|-
| Win
|align=center| 5–2
| Avery Vilche
| Submission (rear-naked choke)
|XFC 18 - Music City Mayhem
|
|align=center|1
|align=center|1:51
|Nashville, Tennessee, United States
|
|-
| Loss
|align=center| 4–2
| Marianna Kheyfets
| TKO (doctor stoppage)
|XFC 16 - High Stakes
|
|align=center|1
|align=center|5:00
|Knoxville, Tennessee, United States
|
|-
| Win
|align=center| 4–1
| Sarah Alpar
| Submission (rear-naked choke)
|FCF - Freestyle Cage Fighting 49
|
|align=center|3
|align=center|1:28
|Shawnee, Oklahoma, United States
|
|-
| Win
|align=center| 3–1
| Jennifer Scott
| TKO (elbows)
|ECSC - Friday Night Fights 3
|
|align=center|2
|align=center|2:19
|Clovis, New Mexico, United States
|
|-
| Win
|align=center| 2–1
| April Coutino
| KO (punch)
|ECSC - Friday Night Fights 1
|
|align=center|1
|align=center|0:10
|Clovis, New Mexico, United States
|
|-
| Win
|align=center| 1–1
| Kyane Hampton
| Submission (armbar)
|ECSC - Evolution 1
|
|align=center|1
|align=center|1:54
|Clovis, New Mexico, United States
|
|-
| Loss
|align=center| 0–1
| Karina Hallinan
| Decision (unanimous)
|VFC 31 - Victory Fighting Championship
|
|align=center|3
|align=center|5:00
|Council Bluffs, Iowa, United States
|
|-

Mixed martial arts exhibition record

|-
| Loss
|align=center| 0–1
| Felice Herrig
| Decision (unanimous)
| The Ultimate Fighter: A Champion Will Be Crowned
|October 22, 2014 (airdate)
|align=center|3
|align=center|5:00
|Las Vegas, Nevada, United States
|
|-

See also
 List of current UFC fighters
 List of female mixed martial artists

References

External links
 Heather Jo Clark at Awakening Fighters
 
 

1980 births
American female mixed martial artists
Mixed martial artists from California
Living people
Boxers from Los Angeles
Strawweight mixed martial artists
Flyweight mixed martial artists
Mixed martial artists utilizing boxing
Mixed martial artists utilizing Brazilian jiu-jitsu
American practitioners of Brazilian jiu-jitsu
Female Brazilian jiu-jitsu practitioners
American women boxers
21st-century American women
Ultimate Fighting Championship female fighters